The legislative districts of Pangasinan are the representations of the province of Pangasinan and the independent component city of Dagupan in the various national legislatures of the Philippines. The province and the city are currently represented in the lower house of the Congress of the Philippines through their first, second, third, fourth, fifth, and sixth congressional districts.

History  
Pangasinan was initially composed of one representative district, wherein it had four representatives, at large, to the Malolos Congress from 1898 to 1899. Two representatives were elected, while the other two were appointed. It was later divided into five legislative districts from 1907 to 1972.

In the disruption caused by the Second World War, two delegates represented the province in the National Assembly of the Japanese-sponsored Second Philippine Republic: one was the provincial governor (an ex officio member), while the other was elected through a provincial assembly of KALIBAPI members during the Japanese occupation of the Philippines. Upon the restoration of the Philippine Commonwealth in 1945, the province retained its five pre-war representative districts.

It was part of the representation of Region I from 1978 to 1984, and from 1984 to 1986 it elected 6 assemblymen at-large.

Pangasinan was reapportioned into six congressional districts under the new Constitution which was proclaimed on February 11, 1987, and elected members to the restored House of Representatives starting that same year.

Current Districts

At-Large (defunct)

1898–1899

1943–1944

1984–1986

References 

Pangasinan
Politics of Pangasinan